Numayr may refer to:
 Numayrid dynasty, a dynasty of chieftains of the Banu Numayr tribe that ruled parts of Upper Mesopotamia in the 10th–12th centuries.
 Numayr, Hadhramaut, Yemen
 Numayr, San‘a’, Yemen